An independence referendum was held in the Republic of Georgia on 31 March 1991. It was approved by 99.5% of voters.

Background
The referendum was sanctioned by the Georgian Supreme Council which was elected in the first multi-party elections held in Soviet Georgia in October 1990, and was dominated by a pro-independence bloc Round Table-Free Georgia led by the Soviet-era dissident Zviad Gamsakhurdia. Having mostly boycotted the all-Union referendum on continued federation and the negotiations on a new union treaty on 17 March, Georgia became the fourth Soviet republic, after the three Baltic states (Lithuania on 9 February 1991 and Latvia and Estonia on 3 March), to organize the referendum on the issue of independence.

The only question of the referendum asked: "Do you support the restoration of the independence of Georgia in accordance with the Act of Declaration of Independence of Georgia of May 26, 1918?" The official results showed over 99% in favor with a 90.6% voter turnout. Due to the ongoing ethnic discord, the polls were largely boycotted by the non-Georgian population of Abkhazia and South Ossetia.

Four days after the final results were announced, the Georgian Supreme Council unanimously passed the declaration of independence on the second anniversary of the Soviet army crackdown on peaceful protests in Tbilisi on 9 April 1989.

The referendum coincided with a private visit of the former U.S. President Richard Nixon who visited a few polling stations in Georgia’s capital Tbilisi before his departure to Moscow later that day.

Results

References

Georgia
Georgia
Modern history of Georgia (country)
Georgia
1991 in Georgia (country)
1991 in international relations
Referendums in Georgia (country)
Referendums in the Soviet Union
Dissolution of the Soviet Union
March 1991 events in Asia